In a volcanic eruption, lava, volcanic bombs and ash, and various gases are expelled from a volcanic vent and fissure. While many eruptions only pose dangers to the immediately surrounding area, Earth's largest eruptions can have a major regional or even global impact, with some affecting the climate and contributing to mass extinctions. Volcanic eruptions can generally be characterized as either explosive eruptions, sudden ejections of rock and ash, or effusive eruptions, relatively gentle outpourings of lava. A separate list is given below for each type.

There have probably been many such eruptions during Earth's history beyond those shown in these lists. However erosion and plate tectonics have taken their toll, and many eruptions have not left enough evidence for geologists to establish their size. Even for the eruptions listed here, estimates of the volume erupted can be subject to considerable uncertainty.

Explosive eruptions

In explosive eruptions, the eruption of magma is driven by the rapid release of pressure, often involving the explosion of gas previously dissolved within the material. The most famous and destructive historical eruptions are mainly of this type. An eruptive phase can consist of a single eruption, or a sequence of several eruptions spread over several days, weeks or months. Explosive eruptions usually involve thick, highly viscous, silicic or felsic magma, high in volatiles like water vapor and carbon dioxide. Pyroclastic materials are the primary product, typically in the form of tuff.

Effusive eruptions

Effusive eruptions involve a relatively gentle, steady outpouring of lava rather than large explosions. They can continue for years or decades, producing extensive fluid mafic lava flows. The ensuing disruptions to the climate may also have killed millions elsewhere. The lava fields of these eruptions measure 565 km2 (Laki), 700 km2 (Eldgjá) and 950 km2 (Þjórsárhraun).

Large igneous provinces

Highly active periods of volcanism in what are called large igneous provinces have produced huge oceanic plateaus and flood basalts in the past. These can comprise hundreds of large eruptions, producing millions of cubic kilometers of lava in total. No large eruptions of flood basalts have occurred in human history, the most recent having occurred over 10 million years ago.  They are often associated with breakup of supercontinents such as Pangea in the geologic record, and may have contributed to a number of mass extinctions. Most large igneous provinces have either not been studied thoroughly enough to establish the size of their component eruptions, or are not preserved well enough to make this possible. Many of the eruptions listed above thus come from just two large igneous provinces: the Paraná and Etendeka traps and the Columbia River Basalt Group. The latter is the most recent large igneous province, and also one of the smallest. A list of large igneous provinces follows to provide some indication of how many large eruptions may be missing from the lists given here.

See also
Extinction event
List of flood basalt provinces
List of large Holocene volcanic eruptions
List of volcanic eruptions in Iceland
List of impact craters on Earth
Lists of earthquakes
Supervolcano#Massive explosive eruptions
Types of volcanic eruptions

Notes

References

Events in the geological history of Earth
 
Cenozoic volcanism
Volcanic eruptions
Geological hazards

he:התפרצות-על#התפרצויות-על היסטוריות